Satan is an embodiment of antagonism, often synonymous with the Devil.

Satan may also refer to:

Characters
 Satan (Image Comics)
 Satan (Old Harry's Game), Satan as portrayed in the radio comedy Old Harry's Game
 Satan, a recurring character in South Park
 Mr. Satan, a character in Dragon Ball media
 Satan, a character in Mark Twain's unfinished book The Mysterious Stranger
 Satan, a character in the Puyo Puyo video game series
 Satan, the main antagonist of the video game Saints Row: Gat out of Hell
 Satan, a character in Japanese manga Blue Exorcist
 Satanas, nickname of a character in Georgette Heyer’s book ‘’These Old Shades’’

Music
 Satan (band), an English British heavy metal band
 "Satan", a song by Teenage Fanclub which appeared on the album Bandwagonesque
 "Satan", an EP and song by Orbital on the album Orbital
 Satan (album), a 1974 album by Sonny Stit

Other uses
 Shaitan, a name for Satan in Arabic mythology
 Great Satan (Persian: شيطان بزرگ; Shaytân-e Bozorg), a demonizing epithet for the United States of America in Iranian foreign policy statements
 Satan (1920 film), a German silent film, aka Satanas
 Satan (1991 film), a Soviet film
 Satan (fish), a genus of sightless catfish
 R-36 (missile) or SS-18 Satan, a Soviet intercontinental ballistic missile
 Satan-2, NATO code name of Russian Intercontinental ballistic missile RS-28 Sarmat
 Security Administrator Tool for Analyzing Networks (SATAN), a networking analyzer

 Miroslav Šatan, an ice hockey player

See also

 God and Satan (disambiguation)
 Devil (disambiguation)
 Lucifer (disambiguation)
 Satanic (disambiguation)
 Satanist (disambiguation)
 Satanism (disambiguation)
 Satanas (disambiguation)
 Satanaya, a mythological figure who appears in many cycles of the Nart sagas of the Caucasus
 Satin, an older English spelling for the type of cloth
 Seitan, a wheat protein